Ankyrin repeat and SOCS box protein 2 is a protein that in humans is encoded by the ASB2 gene.

The protein encoded by this gene is a member of the ankyrin repeat and SOCS box-containing (ASB) family of proteins. They contain ankyrin repeat sequence and SOCS box domain. The SOCS box serves to couple suppressor of cytokine signalling (SOCS) proteins and their binding partners with the elongin B and C complex, possibly targeting them for degradation. This gene is induced by all-trans retinoic acid. In myeloid leukemia cells, the expression of this encoded protein has been shown to induce growth inhibition and chromatin condensation. Multiple alternatively spliced transcript variants have been described for this gene but their full length sequences are not known.

References

External links

Further reading